The Letters Tour was the debut concert tour by Matt Cardle in support of his debut solo album.  It included 23 dates across the UK and Ireland in early 2012.  The tour sold out  causing an extra date to be added.  It received largely positive reviews.

Background

The tour was announced on 24 October 2011 with tickets on general sale on 28 October.  A second date in Dublin was added due to the first selling out.
The tour began on 28 February 2012 in Wales.  He performed all of the album tracks on the first two shows, as well as "Run For Your Life" B-side "Lost & Found". On the third show into the tour he took "Reflections" out of the set list and added a cover of "The First Time Ever I Saw Your Face", a song which he'd received high praise for on The X Factor.

As well as playing acoustic and electric guitar himself, Cardle had a live band backing him, the same band he plays with for promotional appearances and gigs.  They are Remy Mallett on bass, Lorenzo De Feo on lead guitar, pianist Paul Bullen and Tom Peters on drums.
The support act on the tour was Kyle Parry on the first two dates and Roxanne Emery thereafter.

Reception
The tour received largely positive reviews.  Becca Longmire from Entertainment Wise said "Cardle’s voice is amazing, a real natural talent" and "few people seem to be able to portray such emotion through their music, but with Matt it just seemed natural." Amy Senior of Mancunian Matters said "His voice is faultless and his guitar skills more than just a stage novelty and yet unlike most talent show finalists his presence is down to earth and unrehearsed."  Lucy Needham of Retford Today said "Matt shows off his impressive vocal range as he skips between notes with incredible ease."  Fraser Wilson from the Nottingham Post said "time dragged during the opening section of his 70-minute show" but "the singer turned things around in style with a handful of pitch-perfect ballads...you could truly understand why so many people picked up their phones and voted for him."

Daniel Cairns from AAA Music wrote "everyone is shown that he has more to offer than just being an X Factor winner."  Backstage Pass said he "shows his lack of natural confidence between songs but tonight is about music and music alone. His songs are powerful - his impeccable voice could stand alongside anyone and not be embarrassed."  Jackie Davies of South Wales Argus said "his ballads sit equally well alongside the more upbeat, rock inspired numbers" and "he is a natural and affable performer."

Setlist
Stars & Lovers
Amazing
Letters
Walking On Water
Slowly
Faithless
Lost & Found
The First Time Ever I Saw Your Face (Replaced Reflections on the third show)
Beat Of A Breaking Heart
All For Nothing
Pull Me Under
Starlight

Encore:
When We Collide
Run For Your Life

Tour dates

References

2012 concert tours